Carcerato may refer to:

 Carcerato (1951 film)
 Carcerato (1981 film)